WCHT (600 AM) is a news/talk radio station licensed to Escanaba, Michigan, with a power output of 570 watts during the day and 134 watts night, covering much of the central Upper Peninsula of Michigan. The station is owned by AMC Partners, LLC, doing busines as the Radio Results Network and broadcasts from studios on Ludington Avenue in Downtown Escanaba. Its programming is also simulcasted on FM Translator W228DQ, licensed to Escanaba at 93.5 MHz, with an effective radiated power of 250 watts.

History
WCHT first began broadcasting under the WLST call sign in 1958, and then became WBDN around 1971.  WBDN programmed adult contemporary music throughout the 1970s and then went country around 1979, keeping that format until late 1986, when the station switched formats to oldies under the WCHT calls (with the call letters standing for Classic Hits). For a short period of time, WCHT's current news talk format was simulcast on the FM band on WMXG.

References

External links

"Mix 106" on Facebook
Michiguide.com - WCHT History
Michiguide.com - WMXG History
FCC History Cards for WCHT

CHT
Radio stations established in 1971
Radio stations established in 2000